The Federal Mediation and Conciliation Service (FMCS), founded in 1947, is an independent agency of the United States government, and the nation's largest public agency for dispute resolution and conflict management, providing mediation services and related conflict prevention and resolution services in the private, public, and federal sectors. FMCS is tasked with mediating labor disputes around the country; it provides training and relationship development programs for management and unions as part of its role in promoting labor-management peace and cooperation. The Agency also provides mediation, conflict prevention, and conflict management services outside the labor context for federal agencies and the programs they operate. The FMCS headquarters is located in Washington, D.C. with other offices across the country.

About FMCS 
FMCS was created by Congress as a neutral and independent government agency upon enactment of the Labor-Management Relations Act of 1947 (Taft-Hartley Act) and mandated to resolve industrial conflict and promote labor-management peace and cooperation, minimizing the impact of these disputes on the free flow of commerce. With its headquarters in Washington, D.C. and offices across the country, the agency has, for decades, been providing dispute resolution and conflict management services for employers and unions across industries and work activities in the private, public, and federal sectors. FMCS has also been involved in facilitating negotiated rulemaking processes and providing conflict prevention and conflict management for a wide range of agencies in the federal sector. The Agency also has an international program, partnering with more than 60 countries to provide consulting and training in labor dispute resolution and the design of conflict management systems.

Role under the Taft–Hartley Act

The Federal Mediation and Conciliation Service was created as an independent agency of the federal government under the terms of the Labor Management Relations Act of 1947 (better known as the Taft–Hartley Act) to replace the United States Conciliation Service that previously operated within the Department of Labor. Under Taft-Hartley, FMCS may offer its services "in any labor dispute in any industry affecting commerce, either upon its own motion or upon the request of one or more of the parties to the dispute, whenever in its judgment such dispute threatens to cause a substantial interruption of commerce." By statute, FMCS receives advance notification any time a party to a collective bargaining agreement intends to terminate or modify the contract upon expiration. No modification or termination of a collective bargaining agreement is permitted unless the party wishing to modify or terminate notifies the other party at least 60 days prior to expiration and, within 30 days after notice to the other party, notifies FMCS and applicable state mediation agencies. For healthcare institutions, the notice times are extended to 90 and 60 days respectively.

FMCS also has a large labor arbitration program. The Agency maintains a roster of approximately 1,000 private arbitrators who are vetted based on their background, experience, and training in issues arising under collective bargaining agreements. Typically, more than 10,000 requests for arbitrator panels are received by FMCS each year from parties to labor-management grievance disputes. Panels are randomly drawn from the FMCS Roster based on specified parameters, and the parties select an arbitrator who is then officially appointed by FMCS. Arbitrators must abide by the Code of Professional Responsibility for Arbitrators of Labor-Management Disputes, to which FMCS is a signatory; the Code is incorporated by reference in the Agency's federal regulations.

Formation and first director
On August 7, 1947, President of the United States Harry S. Truman appointed Cyrus S. Ching as the first director of the FMCS. As Director of the FMCS, he received $12,000, placing the position at par with the National Labor Relations Board. Ching had been a member of the National War Labor Board until 1943, and had been an employee of the United States Rubber Company since 1919, serving as the firm's director of industrial and public relations in 1929. Ching would take office as of August 22, 1947, the date established in the Taft–Hartley Act for the creation of the FMCS as an independent agency, and would assume the role of the nation's top labor mediator from Edgar L. Warren, who had filled the senior mediation role within the Labor Department. After conferring with the President in August, Ching stated that he would assume his role as director in early September upon the completion of his duties at U.S. Rubber. Ching stated that his role was to settle labor disputes at the level when and where they develop.

Ching was sworn into office on September 5, 1947, with an oath administered by Judge Henry White Edgerton at ceremonies also attended by Howard T. Colvin, who served as acting head from the August 22 creation of the FMCS, as well as other representatives of labor, industry and government.

Directors 
Directors of the Federal Mediation and Conciliation Service (with the date they took office listed and the President who made the appointment shown in parentheses), are as follows: On June 15, 2021, President Biden announced his intent to nominate Javier Ramirez to be the next Director.

Cyrus S. Ching (1947; Truman)
David L. Cole (1952; Truman)
Whitney P. McCoy (1953; Eisenhower)
Joseph F. Finnegan (1955; Eisenhower)
William E. Simkin (1961; Kennedy), the longest-serving Director, departing office in 1969
J. Curtis Counts (1970; Nixon)
William Usery, Jr. (1973; Nixon)
James F. Scearce (1976; Ford)
Wayne L. Horvitz (1977; Carter)
Kenneth Moffett (1982; Reagan), served for seven months.
Kay McMurray (1982; Reagan)
Bernard E. DeLury (1990; G. H. W. Bush)
John Calhoun Wells (1993; Clinton)
C. Richard Barnes (1999; Clinton)
Peter J. Hurtgen (2002; G. W. Bush)
Arthur F. Rosenfeld (2006; G. W. Bush)
George H. Cohen (2009; Obama)
Allison Beck (2014; Obama), the first woman to serve as director
Richard Giacolone (2018; Donald J. Trump)

Notable roles and events 
Representatives of the FMCS played a role in negotiations between Bethlehem Shipbuilding Corporation and the Marine and Shipbuilding Workers in a strike that started in June 1947.

In 1973, a Relationship-by-Objectives (RBO) program is developed for use in extreme cases of poor labor-management relations, when continued deterioration of the relationship could have drastic economic effect. The first RBO program is delivered in Maine on behalf of the Georgia-Pacific Company and Paperworkers Local 27.

In 1975, FMCS officially entered a new arena:  Alternative Dispute Resolution (ADR). Congress passes Public Law 93-531, directing the Service to mediate a 100-year old land dispute between the Hopi and Navajo Indian Tribes in Arizona.

In 1978, Congress extended the FMCS charter to mediate disputes beyond the private sector to the Federal government.

In November,1979, FMCS began mediating age discrimination complaints.

In 1983, FMCS was the first agency to provide the service of negotiated rulemaking, or “reg-neg.” Conducted with the Federal Aviation Administration and Department of Transportation, regulations were developed to deal with flight and duty time of pilots.

The institutionalization of Alternative Dispute Resolution (ADR) came with the passage of the ADR Act of 1990 which created the responsibility of every federal agency to look at its mission and to see what could be resolved through ADR techniques; also to establish an ADR coordinator, and to promote these efforts. FMCS testified and described the kind of work it did both for promoting ADR and negotiated rulemaking.

In 1996, representatives from FMCS facilitated an ADR process in Minnesota regarding land use issues in the Boundary Waters Canoe Area Wilderness (BWCAW) and in Voyageurs National Park (VNP).  In addition to agreements reached on the BWCAW, the mediation team also announced agreements on strategies to handle problems in the park having to do with public safety, improved Park Service consultation with local people, and other issues.

In 1997, representatives from FMCS mediated negotiations between United Parcel Service and the International Brotherhood of Teamsters. It required three weeks of mediation to an end the largest national strike in two decades.

In June 2002, representatives from FMCS facilitated National Institute of Standards and Technology (NIST) discussions in New York City regarding the scope of the subsequent building and fire safety investigation following the Sept. 11, 2001 terrorist attacks. The meetings, which were conducted over the course of five sessions, featured more than 30 speakers, many of whom had family members and friends who were killed in the collapse of the World Trade Center towers. The impact of FMCS’ role was a successful discussion which provided important data for NIST's assessment and investigation.

Representatives of the FMCS mediated negotiations between the National Football League and the National Football League Players Association in contract talks in February 2011.

In November 2012, the National Hockey League and National Hockey League Players Association agreed to submit their negotiations to the FMCS in an effort to resolve the 2012 NHL lockout.

In December 2015, representatives from FMCS facilitated a regulatory negotiations process with the US Department of Energy involving industry, labor groups, and environmentalists to help produce the biggest energy savings standards in US history.

In 2015, representatives of the FMCS mediated negotiations and agreement between the International Longshore and Warehouse Union (ILWU) and the Pacific Maritime Association covering operations at 29 U.S. ports on the Pacific coast. Subsequently, an extension to the contract was announced in with a July 1, 2022 expiration date.

In February 2019, representatives of the FMCS mediated negotiations and agreement between the Denver Classroom Teachers Association and Denver Public School District, ending not only “the first teachers' strike in Denver in 25 years -- it concludes 15 months of sometimes acrimonious negotiations.” 

From January to April 2019, FMCS facilitated regulatory negotiations meetings with the Department of Education. The meetings proposed changes/new regulations for the Federal Student Aid programs authorized under Title IV of the Higher Education Act of 1965 as amended. These particular negotiations were on the topic of Accreditation and Innovation, including TEACH grant requirements, Distance Learning and Faith-Based Institutions. The meetings were live-streamed and open to the public with time at the end of each day for public comment.

In April 2019, FMCS and the Equal Employment Opportunity Commission (EEOC) officially committed to work together to resolve federal workplace disputes by utilizing ADR as a means of efficiently reducing the backlog of federal sector charges,  

In June 2019, FMCS and the Federal Labor Relations Authority (Authority) announced a new commitment to work together to provide labor organizations and agencies with an opportunity to resolve negotiability appeals before they are considered by the Authority's Members for a decision.

In August 2019, representatives of FMCS mediated negotiations between the State of Alaska and the Inlandboatmen's Union, ending a nine-day strike.

In August 2020, representatives from Bath Iron Works and International Association of Machinists Local S6 signed an agreement with FMCS’ assistance to end the shipyard worker strike in Bath, Maine. The 63-day strike drew national attention against the backdrop of a global pandemic and in an election year.

Shared Neutrals program 
In 2019, FMCS began administrative management of the Federal Shared Neutrals Program, an interagency collaborative effort in support of alternative dispute resolution, formerly operated as Sharing Neutrals by the U.S. Department of Health and Human Services (HHS). FMCS administers the program in the National Capital Region, in coordination with participating federal agencies that contribute to, and make use of, a pool of collateral-duty federal employees to mediate cases outside their own agency. In many regions of the country, Federal Executive Boards (FEBs) have created individual programs modeled after the DC-based program but run through each FEB. These programs continue separate operations, except for those who may wish to have FMCS administer their regional Shared Neutrals program.

Annually, the Shared Neutrals Program provides workplace mediation services for hundreds of cases across more than 50 participating agencies and sub-agencies, supported by a pool of more than 250 collateral-duty federal employees who are dedicated to assisting in the resolution of workplace disputes.

Awards and accolades 
FMCS received the top ranking among small Federal agencies as a Best Place to Work in the Federal Government, according to the 2018 rankings by the nonprofit Partnership for Public Service and Boston Consulting Group.

With rankings first being held in 2003, 2018 marks the fifth time FMCS was selected for the top spot, having also earned this distinction in 2005, 2007, 2015, and in 2017. Additionally, the Agency has consistently ranked in the top 4 since the “small agency” category rankings were first included in 2007. Data points from the FEVS revealed that FMCS's 2018 employee engagement score is 87.2 out of 100, which placed FMCS at 1 out of 29 small agencies.

National Labor-Management Conference (NLMC) 
FMCS hosts a biennial conference to promote better relationship and dispute management as a proactive means for preventing conflict that can impair organizational success.  Historically, the NLMC attracts over 1000 industrial relations professionals, representatives of labor and management, academics, arbitrators and legal professionals across the labor relations and employment spectrum. The conference was most recently held in 2016 and 2018 in Chicago. NLMC 2020 is scheduled at the Chicago Hilton Aug. 18–20, 2020.

2013 Washington Examiner Series
In 2013, The Washington Examiner alleged in a series of articles that employees at the agency had made improper purchases such as auto leases and spouses' cellular phones using government credit cards.

In response, the FMCS issued the following statement: "These items which the Examiner is inquiring about appear to have been the subject of a now-settled employment dispute involving a disgruntled FMCS employee. These purchasing issues were addressed in the settlement, but must remain confidential under federal personnel rules, as noted, in the absence of a release from the employee.

"When FMCS became aware of this employee’s concerns about the Agency’s procurement practices, we took immediate actions. These actions included taking steps to ensure that the Agency’s internal processes meet federal regulations. Additionally, we obtained a review by an outside, independent authority regarding FMCS procurements made over a period of years. We conducted a prompt and thorough investigation and a review of our own internal processes. With the settlement of the employment dispute, the conclusion of our own investigation and reviews by outside authorities, the allegations were dropped and outside authorities indicated they would take no further action."

Subsequently, Congressional committee staff in both the House and Senate looked into the allegations that prompted the articles in the Examiner and concluded their inquiries without making any findings against the agency or its employees.

See also
 Title 29 of the Code of Federal Regulations

References

External links
 
 Federal Mediation and Conciliation Service in the Federal Register
Records available on-line through the National Archives Catalog:
Digital Photographs of Officials and Staff, c. 1913 - c. 2009
Director's Speeches and Presentations, 1960 - 2004
History Files, 1947 - 2007
Official Publications, 1947 - 1990

Mediation
Mediation and Conciliation Service
Labor relations organizations